Abdullah Al Marzooqi (born December 12, 1980 Bahrain) is a Bahraini footballer.

Club career
At the club level, Al Marzooqi currently plays for Al-Sailiya of Qatar, although he currently is on leave in pursuing his academics abroad in North America.

International career
He is also a member of the Bahrain national football team.

Career statistics

International goals

See also
 List of men's footballers with 100 or more international caps

References

External links
 

1980 births
Living people
Bahraini footballers
Bahraini expatriate footballers
Expatriate footballers in Kuwait
Bahrain international footballers
Bahraini expatriate sportspeople in Kuwait
Al-Rayyan SC players
Al-Tai FC players
Kuwait SC players
Al-Sailiya SC players
Busaiteen Club players
East Riffa Club players
Bahraini Premier League players
Bahraini expatriate sportspeople in Qatar
2007 AFC Asian Cup players
2011 AFC Asian Cup players
Footballers at the 2002 Asian Games
FIFA Century Club
Qatar Stars League players
Saudi Professional League players
Association football defenders
Asian Games competitors for Bahrain
AFC Cup winning players
Kuwait Premier League players